Curschmann is a German surname. Notable people with the surname include:

Karl Friedrich Curschmann (1804–1841), German song composer
Heinrich Curschmann (1846–1910), German internist who was a native of Giessen
Hans Curschmann (1875–1950), German physician and neurologist remembered for Curschmann-Batten-Steinert syndrome

See also
Curschmann's spirals, a finding in the sputum of several different lung diseases

German-language surnames